Internal Medicine is a peer-reviewed open-access medical journal published monthly by the Japanese Society of Internal Medicine. It was established in 1961 as the Japanese Journal of Medicine and obtained its current title in 1992.

Abstracting and indexing 
The journal is abstracted and indexed in Current Contents, EMBASE, MEDLINE, Science Citation Index, and Scopus.

External links 
 

Open access journals
Monthly journals
English-language journals
Internal medicine journals
Publications established in 1961